Nowbandian may refer to:
 Nowbandian-e Baluchi
 Nowbandian-e Pain